Thomas White (by 1517 – 1590) was an English politician.

He was a Member (MP) of the Parliament of England for Poole in March 1553.

References

1590 deaths
English MPs 1553 (Edward VI)
Year of birth uncertain